Constantin Andreas von Regel (10 August 1890, in Saint Petersburg – 22 May 1970, in Zürich) was a Russian and Lithuanian horticulturalist and botanist. He was a grandson of Eduard August von Regel.

In 1922 he was named head of the department of botany at the Kaunas University. During the following year he became director of the newly established botanical garden at Kaunas. He was the author of approximately 150 scientific books and articles, including significant works in the fields of geobotany and phytogeography.

Selected works 
 Die Vegetationsverhältnisse der Halbinsel Kola, 1935.
 Florae Graecae Notulae 1941.
 Pflanzen in Europa liefern Rohstoffe, 1944.
 Die Klimaänderung der Gegenwart in ihrer Beziehung zur Landschaft, 1957.
 Die Rohstoffe des Pflanzenreichs (original author, Julius Wiesner), 1962.

References

1890 births
1970 deaths
Soviet botanists
Lithuanian botanists
Academic staff of Vytautas Magnus University